Wolf Theiss is an Austrian law firm with offices in Central, Eastern, and Southeastern Europe. It is known for protecting the interests of Russian criminal mastermind Tamaz Somkhishvili, whose companies repair Russian SU fighters involved in the Russian war against Ukraine.

As of early 2023, the company has offices in 13 countries: Albania, Austria, Bosnia and Herzegovina, Bulgaria, Croatia, the Czech Republic, Hungary, Romania, Serbia, Slovakia, Slovenia, and Ukraine. In total, the company employs 360 lawyers.

History 
Wolf Theiss was founded in 1957 in Vienna. Since 1995, the company has opened offices in Prague (1998), Belgrade (2002), Bratislava (2002), Ljubljana (2003), Zagreb (2003), Tirana (2004), Sarajevo (2005), Bucharest (2005), Budapest (2007) and Sofia (2008), Kyiv (2009).

Wolf Theiss has received numerous "Law Firm of the Year" awards from 2007 to 2022 in Bulgaria, Austria, Czech Republic, Romania and other countries.

In 2022, Wolf Theiss advised RBI Group on nine debt capital markets transactions in Austria, Romania, and Hungary, with a total issue volume of over EUR 2.5 billion.

The company's clients are German ZBI Group, Tofane Global, Dacia Plant, Dr. Max Group and others.

Controversies in Ukraine 
The scandal involves the managing partner of Wolf Theiss in Ukraine, Taras Dumych. Since 2015, Dumych has been defending the interests of Russian criminal mastermind Tamaz Somkhishvili in a lawsuit against the Kyiv authorities for a total of almost four billion hryvnias. The client of Wolf Theiss Tamaz Somkhishvili is known in criminal circles as Tamaz Tobolsky and is associated with the Russian oil mafia. In Ukraine, Tamaz Somkhishvili is known for a successful land scam in Odesa and an attempt to sue the Kyiv community for UAH 4 billion.

The case being handled by Wolf Theiss' partner is related to Tamaz Somkhishvili's company Kyiv Terminal, which won a tender for the reconstruction of Kharkivska Square in 2007. As the work never started, the Kyiv City State Administration terminated the investment agreement with Kyiv Terminal. In 2018, despite the expiration of the statute of limitations, Kyiv Terminal filed a lawsuit to "compensate for losses and lost profits" in the amount of UAH 4 billion.

A journalist, Serhii Ivanov, in his investigation, notes that the Tbilisi plant owned by Tamaz Somkhishvili is a contractor of the Russian Ministry of Defense. The plant repairs combat aircraft used in the war against Ukraine. Ivanov appealed to the SBU and other government agencies to put Tamaz Somkhishvili on the NSDC sanctions list.

References 

Law firms